The 2022 United States House of Representatives elections in Massachusetts were held on November 8, 2022, to elect the nine U.S. representatives from the state of Massachusetts, one from each of the state's nine congressional districts. The elections coincided with other elections to the House of Representatives, elections to the United States Senate and various state and local elections. Only two primaries, the Republicans in the 8th and 9th districts were to be held, the rest being uncontested. It is also the largest state (and the state with the most number of congressional districts) in which only a single party won seats in 2022.

District 1

The 1st district is based in the western and central parts of the state, and includes the city of Springfield. The incumbent is Democrat Richard Neal, who was reelected with 96.5% of the vote in 2020 without major-party opposition.

Democratic primary

Nominee
Richard Neal, incumbent U.S. Representative

Endorsements

Results

Republican primary

Nominee
Dean Martilli, business consultant and former Chief of Staff to U.S. Representative Patrick Kennedy of Rhode Island

Results

General election

Predictions

Results

District 2

The 2nd congressional district is in central Massachusetts and includes Worcester. The incumbent is Democrat Jim McGovern, who was reelected with 65.3% of the vote in 2020.

Democratic primary

Nominee
Jim McGovern, incumbent U.S. Representative

Endorsements

Results

Republican primary

Nominee
Jeffrey Sossa-Paquette, child care center owner

Results

General election

Predictions

Results

District 3

The 3rd district is based in northeastern and central Massachusetts, and includes the cities of Lowell, Lawrence, and Haverhill. The incumbent is Democrat Lori Trahan, who was elected with 97.7% of the vote in 2020 without major-party opposition.

Democratic primary

Nominee
Lori Trahan, incumbent U.S. Representative

Failed to qualify 
Miranda Tozier-Robbins

Endorsements

Results

Republican primary

Nominee
Dean Tran, former state senator (2017–2021)

Results

General election

Predictions

Results

District 4

The 4th congressional district is mostly in southern Massachusetts and includes Brookline, the southwestern suburbs of Boston, and northern Bristol County. The incumbent was Democrat Jake Auchincloss, who was elected with 60.8% of the vote in 2020.

Democratic primary

Nominee
Jake Auchincloss, incumbent U.S. Representative

Declined 
 Sam Hyun, chair of the Commonwealth of Massachusetts Asian American and Pacific Islander Commission
 Jesse Mermell, former Brookline select boardmember, former aide to former Governor Deval Patrick, and candidate for this district in 2020

Endorsements

Results

Republican primary

Eliminated in primary
David Cannata, construction safety instructor (write-in)

Results

General election

Predictions

Results

District 5

The 5th congressional district contains Boston's northern and western suburbs, including Malden and Framingham. The incumbent is Democrat Katherine Clark, who was reelected with 74.3% of the vote in 2020.

Democratic primary

Nominee
Katherine Clark, incumbent U.S. Representative and Assistant Speaker of the House

Endorsements

Results

Republican primary

Nomine
Caroline Colarusso, ice hockey coach, former  Stoneham selectwoman, and nominee for this district in 2020

Failed to qualify 
Norman Schwartz

Results

General election

Predictions

Results

District 6

The 6th district is based in northeastern Massachusetts, and contains most of Essex County, including the North Shore and Cape Ann. The incumbent is Democrat Seth Moulton, who was reelected with 65.4% of the vote in 2020.

Democratic primary

Nominee
Seth Moulton, incumbent U.S. Representative

Endorsements

Results

Republican primary

Nominee
Robert May, mechanical engineer and business consultant

Results

Independents and third parties

Candidates
Mark Tashjian (Independent), entrepreneur

General election

Predictions

Results

District 7

The 7th district is in eastern Massachusetts, including roughly three-fourths of Boston and a few of its northern and southern suburbs. The incumbent is Democrat Ayanna Pressley, who was reelected with 86.6% of the vote in 2020 without major-party opposition.

Democratic primary

Nominee
Ayanna Pressley, incumbent U.S. Representative

Endorsements

Results

Republican primary

Nominee
Donnie Palmer, U.S. Army veteran and professional boxer

Results

General election

Predictions

Results

District 8

The 8th district includes South Boston and the southern Boston metro area. The incumbent is Democrat Stephen F. Lynch, who was reelected with 80.7% of the vote in 2020 without major-party opposition.

Democratic primary

Nominee
Stephen Lynch, incumbent U.S. Representative

Endorsements

Results

Republican primary

Nominee
Robert Burke, activist

Eliminated in primary
Hamilton Rodrigues, real estate broker

Endorsements

Results

Independents

Declared
Derek Smith

General election

Predictions

Results

District 9

The 9th district encompasses Cape Cod and the South Shore, and extends westward into New Bedford, part of Fall River, and surrounding suburbs. The incumbent is Democrat Bill Keating, who was reelected with 61.3% of the vote in 2020.

Democratic primary

Nominee
Bill Keating, incumbent U.S. Representative

Endorsements

Results

Republican primary

Nominee
Jesse Brown, member of the MassHire State Workforce Board and Marine Corps veteran

Eliminated in primary 
Dan Sullivan, registered nurse

Endorsements

Results

General election

Predictions

Results

References

External links
Official campaign websites for 1st district candidates
 Richard Neal (D) for Congress

Official campaign websites for 2nd district candidates
 Jim McGovern (D) for Congress
 Jeffrey Sossa-Paquette (R) for Congress

Official campaign websites for 3rd district candidates
 Lori Trahan (D) for Congress
 Dean Tran (R) for Congress

Official campaign websites for 4th district candidates
 Jake Auchincloss (D) for Congress
 Emily Burns (R) for Congress
 Julie Hall (R) for Congress

Official campaign websites for 5th district candidates
 Katherine Clark (D) for Congress

Official campaign websites for 6th district candidates
 Robert May (R) for Congress
 Seth Moulton (D) for Congress

Official campaign websites for 7th district candidates
 Ayanna Pressley (D) for Congress

Official campaign websites for 8th district candidates
 Stephen F. Lynch (D) for Congress
 Hamilton Rodrigues (R) for Congress

Official campaign websites for 9th district candidates
 Jesse Brown (R) for Congress
 Bill Keating (D) for Congress
 Mark Littles (R) for Congress

2022
Massachusetts
United States House of Representatives